Marija Senica (born 25 August 25 1970) is a Serbian synchronized swimmer. 

Marija competed as an Independent Olympic Participant at the 1992 Summer Olympics in Barcelona and took twenty-first place in the women's solo. 

She currently works as a national team coach for Serbia.

References

1970 births
Living people
Serbian synchronized swimmers
Olympic synchronized swimmers as Independent Olympic Participants
Synchronized swimmers at the 1992 Summer Olympics